Tetrarhanis symplocus, the Clench's on-off, is a butterfly in the family Lycaenidae. It is found in Liberia, Ivory Coast, Ghana, Togo, Benin and western Nigeria. The habitat consists of primary forests.

References

Butterflies described in 1965
Poritiinae